The Kiunga-Tabubil Highway is an all-weather gravel road that runs from the river port town of Kiunga through Ningerum and Tabubil to the Ok Tedi Mine site, in the remote North Fly District of the Western Province of Papua New Guinea.

The "highway" was built in the early 1980s. It is maintained by Ok Tedi Mining Limited, who are the greatest beneficiaries of the road. The highway, for the most part, runs parallel with the Ok Tedi River, which is an incredibly fast moving and volatile river since it is a high-volume waterway resting on a sand bank. Parts of the highway are often consumed by the river and need to be rebuilt. The cost of maintaining this road is K1.5 million a year, in a region where people have an average annual income of about K50 a year. In 2019 it was announced that the highway would be sealed over three years by OTML under the government tax credit scheme at an estimated cost of K100 million.

There is a copper slurry pipeline running along the full length of the road from the mine site north of Tabubil down to Bige.

The full length of the road was first cycled in 2013 by Luke Jackson, Dylan Carroll, Michael Hayen and Mikel Wolters.

References

Western Province (Papua New Guinea)
Road transport in Papua New Guinea
Gravel roads